The FA Cup was a United Arab Emirates football tournament for UAE Football League teams played for five seasons between 1992–94 and 1999-2002. Each edition featured two groups and played on a leg basis similar to the Etisalat Emirates Cup which appeared to take over from the competition in 2008.

External links
United Arab Emirates - List of Cup Winners, RSSSF.com

FA
Recurring sporting events established in 1992
1992 establishments in the United Arab Emirates
Recurring sporting events disestablished in 2002